Two Bit Monsters was singer-songwriter John Hiatt's fourth album, released in 1980.  It was his second of two albums with MCA Records.  It failed to chart, and MCA dropped Hiatt. "It Hasn't Happened Yet" would later be a minor country hit for Rosanne Cash off her album Somewhere in the Stars.  Cash also covered "Pink Bedroom" on her next release, Rhythm & Romance.

Track listing
All tracks written by John Hiatt, except where noted

"Back To Normal" – 3:18
"Down In Front" – 3:22
"I Spy (For The F.B.I.)" – 2:41 (Richard "Popcorn" Wylie, Herman Kelley)
"Pink Bedroom" – 2:53
"Good Girl, Bad World" – 3:14
"Face The Nation" – 3:07
"Cop Party" – 2:54
"Back To The War" – 3:28
"It Hasn't Happened Yet" – 3:22
"String Pull Job" – 3:22
"New Numbers" – 3:02

Personnel
John Hiatt – guitar, vocals
Howard Epstein – bass guitar, background vocals
Shane Keister – keyboards, organ, piano
Darrell Verdusco – drums, background vocals
Technical
Denny Bruce - Producer
Mark Howlett – recording, mixing
John Van Hamersveld – photography, design

References

1980 albums
John Hiatt albums
MCA Records albums
Albums produced by Denny Bruce